Quantavious Tavario Thomas (born December 17, 1992), known professionally as Young Nudy, is an American rapper. Thomas is best known for his mixtapes Slimeball (2016), Slimeball 2 (2017), and Slimeball 3 (2018), and his collaborative song "Since When" (2018) with his cousin 21 Savage. He released his debut studio album Anyways on February 24, 2020, followed by Dr. Ev4l in 2021.

The rapper, who signed with Paradise East Records, RCA Records and Same Plate Entertainment prior to the release of 2018's Slimeball 3, has several viral hits such as the unreleased song "Pissy Pamper" (featuring Playboi Carti). As of mid-2019, he has been featured on the Dreamville Records single "Down Bad" along with its co-founder J. Cole, JID, Bas and EarthGang. The song became his first Billboard Hot 100 hit, reaching number 64. His collaboration album Sli'merre with American record producer Pi'erre Bourne debuted at number 167 on the US Billboard 200 and peaked at number 63 the following week. The project, consisting of 12 songs, featured fellow rappers Lil Uzi Vert, 21 Savage, Megan Thee Stallion and DaBaby. The project is deemed his breakout album, being released to generally positive reviews.

On February 3, 2019, Thomas and 21 Savage were arrested in a targeted operation in DeKalb County, Georgia. Thomas was charged with aggravated assault, while Savage was arrested by Immigration and Customs Enforcement and alleged to be in the United States illegally from the United Kingdom.

Early life
Thomas was born in East Atlanta, DeKalb County, Georgia, in the Paradise East Apartments. He is the older brother to PDE 4L Escobar and a cousin to fellow Atlanta-based rapper 21 Savage. Nudy grew up with his mother but said he had a closer bond with his grandparents than he had with his mother. He is of Jamaican descent.

Career

2015–2018: Slimeball 2, Nudy Land, and Slimeball 3

In 2015, Nudy was featured on American rapper 21 Savage's's song "Air It Out". Later that year, Nudy released the mixtape Paradise 2 East Atlanta with rapper Kourtney Money.

In 2017, Nudy released the sequel to Slimeball, Slimeball 2, which featured artists Juicy J, Peso, 21 Savage and Kourtney Money, as well as production by Metro Boomin, Pi'erre Bourne, and Richie Souf. Its lead single, "EA" featured 21 Savage and garnered 146 million streams on Spotify and was certified Platinum by the RIAA on October 24th, 2022.

In late 2017, Nudy released the Nudy Land mixtape, which featured rappers Offset and Lil Yachty. It was once more produced by longtime producer Pierre Bourne. The mixtape also featured 13 tracks. As of June 2019, the mixtape has surpassed 30 million total streams on Spotify.

Prior to the release of Slimeball 3, Young Nudy signed a multi-million dollar, four-album record deal with Paradise East Records, RCA Records and Same Plate Entertainment.

In August 2018, Nudy released the 14-track Slimeball 3 mixtape, as the sequel to the previous Slimeballs. The mixtape featured production by Pi'erre Bourne, Metro, Wheezy, 13teen and Maaly Raw, among others. Previous singles "Do That" and "Sherbert" were among the 14 tracks on the mixtape. The mixtape became Nudy's first charting project on the Billboard 200, peaking at number 146. The project has a total of over 18 million streams on Apple Music as of May 2019.

2019–present: Faded in the Booth, Sli'merre, Anyways, and Dr. Ev4l

In April 2019, Nudy released a surprise project titled Faded in the Booth. On August 21, 2019, Young Nudy and RCA Records re-released the project on streaming platforms. Just two weeks before the release of his collaborative mixtape Sli'merre, a song entitled "Pissy Pamper" with fellow rapper Playboi Carti surfaced. The track, produced by Pi'erre Bourne, became an internet meme, with Playboi Carti performing the song at Coachella. An unofficial upload of the song—which has not yet been officially released—has over 4 million plays on SoundCloud. His collaboration album Sli'merre with American record producer Pi'erre Bourne debuted at number 167 on the US Billboard 200 and peaked at number 63 the following week. In June 2019, Young Nudy and Pi'erre Bourne confirmed that the song would no longer be released due to sample clearance issues.

On May 11, producer ChaseTheMoney revealed what is thought to be a tracklist for Nudy's album CTMX2. The tracklist has a number of artists such as Billie Eilish, Young Thug and most notably featured the song "God Flinch" featuring Nudy, J. Cole and Drake; the song was eventually released without Drake as "Sunset" on Dreamville's mixtape Revenge of the Dreamers III on July 5, 2019. Young Nudy appeared on the J. Cole-executively produced album twice, including the aforementioned song "Sunset" and on the single "Down Bad" along with JID, Bas, EarthGang and Cole himself. Later on, Young Nudy, alongside Calboy were added as supporting acts on 21 Savage's I Am Greater than I Was Tour across the United States.

On November 20, 2019, the Grammy Awards announced the nominations for the 62nd Annual Grammy Awards, in which Young Nudy was nominated for his feature on the 2019 Dreamville Records single 'Down Bad", along with JID, Bas, J. Cole and Earthgang, as well as for his contributions to the aforementioned record label's compilation album Revenge of the Dreamers 3 and his cousin 21 Savage's I Am Greater Than I Was. On February 27, 2020, Young Nudy released his debut studio album titled Anyways, which totaled 16 tracks. The album received positive critical reception, receiving a 7.5/10 by Pitchfork critic Israel Daramola. The album peaked at 109 on the Billboard 200.

After the release of Anyways, in 2020, Young Nudy announced a North American tour which was set to run from March 20 to April 30, and travel to 25 different cities in the United States. However, COVID-19 concerns caused the tour to be postponed.

On May 18, 2021, Young Nudy released his second studio album, Dr. Ev4l. It features fellow rappers Lil Uzi Vert, 21 Savage, and G Herbo, with production from Coupe, Mojo, Bavier, and 20 Rocket. The album was preceded by the May 11-released single "2Face", featuring G Herbo. The album was released to generally positive reviews and peaked at 93 on the Billboard 200.

In May 2021, Nudy and 21 Savage's track "EA" from Nudy's 2017 mixtape SlimeBall 3 went viral after a video in which the song plays shows a floor collapsing at a graduation party, with the partygoers falling through the floor. Nudy responded to the incident and donated money to the homeowner.

Legal issues
On February 3, 2019, while Nudy and his cousin 21 Savage were riding in a car in Atlanta, they were pulled over by police and arrested in an operation targeting Nudy and two other men. Savage was arrested by Immigration and Customs Enforcement and charged with being in the United States illegally from Britain. Nudy was charged with aggravated assault and violation of the Georgia Gang Act. Nudy's lawyer stated "We believe that Young Nudy is innocent and this is a case of mistaken identity. Young Nudy's legal team is working closely with law enforcement to ensure this case does not get blown out of proportion." Nudy's attorney stated that the charges stem from a 2017 investigation, which he states Atlanta Police investigated Nudy on and dropped the charges. On February 12, Savage was released on bail, and on February 19, Nudy was granted $100,000 bail, and was released the next day.

Musical style
Young Nudy raps, combining elements of hip hop music and contemporary R&B. Nudy's style has been compared to other rappers such as 03 Greedo, Yung Bans, and Lil Keed. Despite his close relationship with his cousin 21 Savage, he has been noted for having a "completely opposite" style from Savage.

Discography

Studio albums

Collaborative albums

Mixtapes

Singles

As lead artist

As featured artist

Other charted songs

Guest appearances

Notes

References

1992 births
Living people
Rappers from Atlanta
American hip hop singers
African-American male rappers
21st-century American rappers
Rappers from Georgia (U.S. state)
21st-century American male musicians
RCA Records artists
Gangsta rappers
Trap musicians
Bloods